The Uralla News was an English language newspaper published in Uralla, New South Wales, Australia between 1904 and approximately 1915.

History
This newspaper was first published on 29 April 1904 by Joseph Elliott.  It was published weekly and ceased publication in approximately 1915.

Digitisation 
The paper has been digitised as part of the Australian Newspapers Digitisation Program of the National Library of Australia.

References

External links 
 

Defunct newspapers published in New South Wales
Publications established in 1904
Publications disestablished in 1915
Newspapers on Trove